Motsetsi Cave (also known as Motsetse) is a fossil-bearing breccia filled cavity located about  east of the well known South African hominid-bearing sites of Sterkfontein and Kromdraai and about  north-northwest of Johannesburg, South Africa. Motsetsi has been declared a South African National Heritage Site.

History of investigations

Motsetsi has been investigated since its discovery by Lee Berger in 1999. Since then a series of part-time excavations have recovered tens of thousands of fossils. Excavations have been conducted at Motsetse by the University of the Witwatersrand and at times in conjunction with Peter Schmid of the University of Zurich. Only a very small part of this site has been excavated.

Recovered fossils
Of the many thousands of fossils recovered from Motsetsi, no hominid fossils have yet been found. Many very fine fossils of other animals, however, have been discovered including the remains of very well preserved Dinofelis fossils – a type of false saber-toothed cat.

Geology
Motsetse is a series of breccia-filled dolomitic caves that formed in a fissure along a geological fault.

Age of the deposits
Motsetsi has been dated to 1.0 to 1.6 million years old based on the animals recovered.

References

Archaeological sites in South Africa
Caves of South Africa
Landforms of Gauteng
Limestone caves
Pleistocene paleontological sites of Africa
South African heritage sites
Archaeological sites of Southern Africa